Lake Tuctococha (possibly from Quechua tuqtu broody hen, qucha lake) is a lake in Peru located in the Junín Region, Yauli Province, Carhuacayan District. It lies northeast of Yanque.

References 

Lakes of Peru
Lakes of Junín Region